Montrouzierella is a genus of leaf beetles in the subfamily Eumolpinae. It is known from the South Province and Mont Panié of New Caledonia, and is named after Xavier Montrouzier, the pioneer entomologist of New Caledonia. The genus was established based on general proportions and body size, and may be polyphyletic or paraphyletic.

Species
 Montrouzierella brinoni Jolivet, Verma & Mille, 2007
 Montrouzierella flava Jolivet, Verma & Mille, 2007
 Montrouzierella metrosiderosi Jolivet, Verma & Mille, 2011
 Montrouzierella nana Jolivet, Verma & Mille, 2007
 Montrouzierella subtuberculata Jolivet, Verma & Mille, 2010
 Montrouzierella tuberculata Jolivet, Verma & Mille, 2007

The following species have been transferred to other genera:
 Montrouzierella costata Jolivet, Verma & Mille, 2007: transferred to Kumatoeides
 Montrouzierella hispida Jolivet, Verma & Mille, 2013: transferred to Dematotrichus

References

Eumolpinae
Chrysomelidae genera
Insects of New Caledonia
Beetles of Oceania
Endemic fauna of New Caledonia